Robert George Woollard (born July 27, 1940) is an American former professional basketball player. He played for the Miami Floridians during the second half of the 1969–70 ABA season after a collegiate career at Wake Forest University.

Woollard became a schoolteacher and high school basketball coach in his post-playing years.

References

1940 births
Living people
American men's basketball players
Basketball players from New Jersey
Bloomfield High School (New Jersey) alumni
Centers (basketball)
High school basketball coaches in the United States
Miami Floridians players
New York Knicks draft picks
People from Bloomfield, New Jersey
People from Hendersonville, North Carolina
Sportspeople from Essex County, New Jersey
Wake Forest Demon Deacons men's basketball players